Yegakor is a village in the Tartar Rayon of Azerbaijan.

References 

Populated places in Tartar District